is a 1967 Japanese chambara film directed by Kenji Misumi and starring Shintaro Katsu as the blind masseur Zatoichi. It was originally released by the Daiei Motion Picture Company (later acquired by Kadokawa Pictures).

Zatoichi Challenged is the seventeenth episode in the 26-part film series devoted to the character of Zatoichi.

Synopsis

Zatoichi (Katsu) checks into an inn where he shares a room with an ill woman and her young son named Ryota. Before the woman dies, she requests that Zatoichi take her son to his father, an artist living in the nearby town of Maebara. As they travel together, they hitch a ride with a traveling performance troupe.

The final scene of the movie features Ichi fighting his old samurai friend during snowfall in order to protect the young boy. Although having won the fight fairly by seriously wounding his friend Ichi sacrifices himself by throwing his sword at an approaching servant that is given orders to kill the boy's father thus becoming un-armed. His old samurai friend is unable to strike the now defenseless Ichi with his sword, admits defeat and departs mortally wounded leaving a trail of blood in the snow.

Cast
 Shintaro Katsu as Zatoichi
 Jushiro Konoe as Akazuka
 Miwa Takada as Omitsu
 Yukiji Asaoka as Tomoe
 Mikiko Tsubouchi as Osen
 Mie Nakao as Miyuki
 Takao Ito as Shokichi
 Midori Isomura as Omine
 Eitaro Ozawa as Torikoshi
 Asao Koike as Boss Gonzo

Reception

Critical response
J. Doyle Wallis, in a review for DVD Talk, wrote that "[w]hile it had the great Kenji Misumi, one of samurai cinema's greats and a personal favorite director of mine, behind the camera, not every film in such a long film cycle can be perfect. Unfortunately this is one of the weaker films. Misumi's direction is still quite good and his signature perfect framing is as fantastic as it ever was, particularly in the great finale which features one of Ichi's longest duels. Katsu is also, as he always was, great. The man could act with any part of his body and he displays some of the finest ear and foot acting you're likely to see. But, while entertaining enough for Katsu and Misum's inherent skill, the film suffers from a slapdash script and that damn annoying kid factor. The series' one major fault was its lack of development and reliance on formula. While usually that formula is a winner, here it just feels a tad tired."

Adaptation
The 1989 American samurai-action film Blind Fury (starring Rutger Hauer) is a loose modernization of Zatoichi Challenged.

References

External links
 
 
 
 Zatoichi Challenged (1967), review by D. Trull for Lard Biscuit Enterprises
 Zatoichi Challenged (1967), review by Steve Kopian for Unseen Films (19 February 2014)
 Review: Zatoichi Challenged (1967), by Thomas Raven for Freakengine.com (March 2012)
 Zatoichi Challenged, review by Andrew Pragasam for The Spinning Image 
 Zatoichi Chi Kemuri Kaido, review by Paghat the Ratgirl for Wild Realm Reviews

Japanese adventure films
1967 films
Zatoichi films
Daiei Film films
Films set in Japan
Films shot in Japan
Films directed by Kenji Misumi
Films scored by Akira Ifukube
1960s Japanese films